Ilias Triantafyllou (born 14 August 1970) is a retired Greek football defender.

References

1970 births
Living people
Ilisiakos F.C. players
Ethnikos Asteras F.C. players
Marko F.C. players
Super League Greece players
Association football defenders
Footballers from Athens
Greek footballers